KELT may refer to:

A Salmonid that has spawned and did not die as a result
An alternative spelling of Celt
KELT (FM), call letters of an FM radio station located in Encinal, Texas
KELT, the former call letters of an FM radio station located in Adelanto, California
Kelt (beer), a beer found in Slovakia and the Czech Republic
The NATO Reporting Name (AS-5 Kelt) for the Raduga KSR-2 cruise missile formerly used by the armed forces of the Soviet Union
The acronym for Kilodegree Extremely Little Telescope, an astronomical survey for transiting exoplanets, or the planets discovered by the KELT survey, such as
KELT-2Ab
KELT-9b